The Taipei tree frog (Zhangixalus taipeianus) is a species of frog in the family Rhacophoridae. It is endemic to central and northern Taiwan.

Its natural habitats are subtropical or tropical moist lowland forest, subtropical or tropical moist montane forest, swamps, intermittent freshwater marshes, arable land, plantations, ponds, and irrigated land. It is potentially threatened by habitat loss, although its population trend is stable.

See also
List of protected species in Taiwan
List of endemic species of Taiwan

References

taipeianus
Amphibians of Taiwan
Endemic fauna of Taiwan
Amphibians described in 1978
Taxonomy articles created by Polbot